Significant Other is a 2022 American sci-fi horror film written and directed by Dan Berk and Robert Olsen. The film stars Maika Monroe and Jake Lacy as a couple dealing with relationship issues while backpacking in the woods in the Pacific Northwest, whose activities are interrupted by a meteor strike bringing an alien lifeform into the picture.

In September 2021, Paramount Players won a bidding war for the film, with Monroe and Lacy already attached to star, and Berk and Olsen to direct. The film was released on the streaming service Paramount+ on October 7, 2022.

Plot
A red object falls from the sky, hitting into a wooded area, and a deer in the woods is grabbed by a tentacle.

Ruth and Harry, an unmarried couple in a six-year relationship, agree to pursue Harry's interest in camping together in the woods. They hike to a scenic overlook, where Harry proposes marriage.  The anxiety-prone Ruth panics and rejects him. Walking in the woods the next day, they come across a dead deer covered in a black substance, which Harry guesses to be the result of an illness. 

Later, Ruth enters a cave and finds a blue puddle. Emerging from the cave, she tells Harry she has reconsidered and wants him to propose to her again. This time, however, when they reach the scenic overlook, she pushes him to his apparent death. Wandering in the woods afterwards, Ruth finds another couple, but Harry appears and kills the other couple.

It is revealed that when Ruth found the blue puddle, she also saw Harry's dead body in a cocoon in the cave, and knew he had been replaced by an imposter. The imposter, an alien that has taken Harry's place, finds itself unable to kill Ruth because it absorbed Harry's love for her—an experience unknown outside of Earth, and to which the alien finds it difficult to adapt. 

Ruth again tries to kill the alien, but it places her in a cocoon and tries to absorb her as it did Harry, explaining that more of its kind are coming and will eventually take over the Earth, an experience from which it now wishes to protect Ruth. As it does, however, it absorbs Ruth's anxieties and memories of her childhood traumas. The real Ruth, escaping the cocoon, uses these anxieties, to which the alien is unaccustomed, to subdue the alien and escape. 

As she drives away, the alien speaks to her through the car radio, and red objects fall from the sky, signifying the broader alien invasion.

Cast
 Maika Monroe as Ruth 
 Jake Lacy as Harry 
 Matthew Yang King as Ray
 Dana Green as Vivian
 Loudon McCleery as Jimmy
 Teal Sherer as Dolores
 Marcella Lentz-Pope as Therapist Receptionist
 Andrew Morgado as Radio Announcer

Production
In September 2021, it was announced that Paramount Players had won a bidding war for the rights to Significant Other, a science fiction thriller script by Dan Berk and Robert Olsen, who were also attached to direct. Maika Monroe and Jake Lacy were set to star, and the film was set to be released on Paramount+.

Filming took place in Oregon, including Silver Falls State Park, Nehalem, Silverton, Cornelius, Cloverdale, Estacada, Sublimity, Eagle Creek, and Sandy.

Reception
 

The New York Times gave the film a generally positive review, calling it "a rich and eventful ride" and writing that it "does not reinvent the genre, but its narrative flourishes make for an exciting outing", while The A.V. Club found it more lackluster, describing it as "far from a must-see, but there are rewards for those who stick to the end".

References

External links
 

2022 horror films
2022 science fiction films
2022 science fiction horror films
2020s American films
2020s English-language films
Alien invasions in films
American science fiction horror films
Films about camping
Films set in forests
Films shot in Oregon
Paramount+ original films
Paramount Players films